The Katana, or Sanyo SCP-6600, was a type of mobile phone. It was released in the United States in the third quarter of 2006 by Sanyo Electric Co. The Katana was a clamshell style phone. The Katana was an "ultraslim" mobile phone with a design similar to the Motorola Razr V3.

Providers 
The phone was available in the US through Sprint as well as CREDO Mobile, Qwest, Embarq, Liberty Wireless, and Humane Wireless. 
The Katana was also available in Canada by Bell Mobility, Sasktel and MTS.
The Katana was available in New Zealand by  Telecom
The Katana was available in India by Reliance sub-sector "A. Bilgi"

Colors 
The Sanyo Katana came in four colors, including mystic black, blue sapphire, cherry blossom and polar white, which was available exclusively through RadioShack.

In New Zealand the 'polar white' Katana was sold as "Sanyo ICE," the cherry blossom Katana was sold as "Sanyo Diva," the mystic black as "Sanyo 6600." Blue sapphire was not sold in New Zealand.

Features 
 Calling
 Sending Text Messages
 Receiving Text Messages
 Clock
 Calculator
 Color Screen
 Ringtones
 Sturdy hinge
 Speakerphone
 0-9 keypad buttons
 Calendar
 Holds up to 100 contacts
 Texts up to 160 characters

Media 
It was the phone of Dr. Christopher Turk on the television show Scrubs.

Katana